Bolek i Lolek is a 1936 Polish comedy film directed by Michał Waszyński.

Cast
Adolf Dymsza ... Bolek Cybuch / Lolek Charkiewicz
Janina Wilczówna... Krysia Brown
Antoni Fertner ... Mr. Brown
Andrzej Bogucki ... Lolek's friend
Jadwiga Bukojemska
Helena Cary
Maria Chmurkowska ... Lolek's Aunt
Feliks Chmurkowski ... Lolek's Father
Wladyslaw Grabowski ... Jan, Lolek's servant
Janina Janecka ... Foreman
Zdzisław Karczewski ... Franek
Jerzy Kobusz ... Janek

External links 
 

1936 films
1930s Polish-language films
Polish black-and-white films
Films directed by Michał Waszyński
1936 comedy films
Polish comedy films